Saletara is a genus of butterflies in the family Pieridae.

Species
Saletara cycinna  (Hewitson, 1861) New Guinea
Saletara liberia  (Cramer, [1779]) Peninsular Malaya, Singapore, Sumatra, Moluccas, Philippines 
Saletara panda   (Godart, 1819)  Malay Peninsula, Sumatra, Java, Bali, Borneo, Palawan, Philippines, Sulawesi (may be subspecies of Saletara liberia)
Saletara gisco   (Grose-Smith, 1895) Solomon Islands

References

External links
images representing  Saletara at  Consortium for the Barcode of Life

Pierini
Pieridae genera
Taxa named by William Lucas Distant